Peterborough Orfuns was a Canadian football team in Ontario Rugby Football Union. The team played in the 1938 and 1939 seasons.

Though often mistakenly called "Orphans", their name is actually a play on their league name: O R F Uns.

Later the team would continue on as an Intermediate (the league between Senior ORFU and Junior football) competitor, finishing in the national championships 3 times: 1952 (losing 31–18 to the Norwood/St. Boniface Legionaries of Manitoba), 1954 (losing 16–12 to the Winnipeg Rams) and 1955 (National Champions.)

ORFU season-by-season

References

Ontario Rugby Football Union teams
Canadian football teams in Ontario
Sport in Peterborough, Ontario
Defunct Canadian football teams
1938 establishments in Ontario
1939 disestablishments in Ontario
Sports clubs established in 1938
Sports clubs disestablished in 1939